The 1926 World Table Tennis Championships men's doubles was the first edition of the men's doubles championship.
Roland Jacobi and Daniel Pecsi defeated Zoltán Mechlovits and Béla von Kehrling in the final by three sets to one.

Draw

Finals

See also
List of World Table Tennis Championships medalists

References

-